Stanton Hill is a mountain in Greene County, New York. It is located in the Catskill Mountains north-northeast of Medway. Potic Mountain is located south of Stanton Hill.

References

Mountains of Greene County, New York
Mountains of New York (state)